The August and Eliza Fuermann Jr. House is located in Watertown, Wisconsin.

History
The house was occupied for roughly 40 years by hatmaker Clara Weiss. It was later resided in by the Fuermanns, who were members of a prominent brewing family.

References

Houses on the National Register of Historic Places in Wisconsin
National Register of Historic Places in Jefferson County, Wisconsin
Houses in Jefferson County, Wisconsin
Queen Anne architecture in Wisconsin
Brick buildings and structures
Houses completed in 1903